Nicolò Vernely or Nicolò Verneey (died 1563) was a Roman Catholic prelate who served as Bishop of Bagnoregio (1545–1563).

Biography
On 22 May 1545, Nicolò Vernely was appointed during the papacy of Pope Paul III as Bishop of Bagnoregio. 
On 30 May 1547, he was consecrated bishop in the Sistine Chapel by Giovanni Giacomo Barba, Bishop of Teramo. 
He served as Bishop of Bagnoregio until his death in 1563.

While bishop, he was the principal co-consecrator of Bernardino Maffei, Bishop of Massa Marittima (1547).

References

External links and additional sources
 (for Chronology of Bishops) 
 (for Chronology of Bishops) 

16th-century Italian Roman Catholic bishops
1563 deaths
Bishops appointed by Pope Paul III